The City of Bradford Metropolitan District Council elections were held on Thursday, 4 May 1990, with one third of the council up for election as well as vacancies in Great Horton & Ilkley to be elected. Labour had suffered a defection prior to the election in the University ward, with the sitting councillor attempting, unsuccessfully, to defend it as a Conservative. Labour regained control of the council from no overall control following numerous gains from the Conservatives.

Election result

This result had the following consequences for the total number of seats on the council after the elections:

Ward results

References

1990 English local elections
1990
1990s in West Yorkshire